Central Coast Division Junior Rugby League (CCDJRL) is a junior rugby league competition based on the Central Coast of NSW, Australia. There are 17 teams ranging from Under 6's to Under 17's. There are non-competitive competitions for Under 6's to Under 9's and competitive competitions for Under 10's to Under 17's.

Rugby league competitions in New South Wales